Anthony Beeson (born April 1948) was a classical iconographer and an expert on Roman and Greek art and architecture. He was also the archivist of the Association for Roman Archaeology and the former art librarian at Bristol City Libraries. He reassembled the Orpheus Mosaic in Bristol City Museum and Art Gallery.

Selected publications
 Central Bristol Through The Ages
 Central Bristol Through Time
 North Bristol Through Time
 North Brighton: London Road to Coledean Through Time
 North Brighton: Preston, Withdean & Patcham Through Time
 Wareham and The Isle of Purbeck Through Time
 Westbury on Trym to Avonmouth Through Time

References 

Living people
1948 births
People from Brighton
English librarians
English non-fiction writers
English local historians
Historians of Bristol